Thomas Kastanaras (born 9 January 2003) is a German professional footballer who plays as a forward for Bundesliga club VfB Stuttgart.

Club career
Kastanaras played for the youth teams of TB Untertürkheim and FSV Waiblingen before he joined VfB Stuttgart in 2011. On 3 March 2022, he extended his contract with VfB Stuttgart until June 2025. After leading the club's under-19 side in scoring with 26 goals during the 2021–22 season, Kastanaras was promoted to Stuttgart's senior side for the 2022–23 season. Kastanaras made his Bundesliga debut for Stuttgart on 17 September 2022 against Eintracht Frankfurt.

International career
Born in Germany, Kastanaras is of Greek descent. He formerly represented Greece internationally up to the Greece U19s, before switching to represent the Germany U20s in 2022.

References

2003 births
Living people
German people of Greek descent
German footballers
Greek footballers
Footballers from Stuttgart
Germany youth international footballers
Greece youth international footballers
Association football forwards
Bundesliga players
VfB Stuttgart players